Kashmir Udaas Hai is a book that was written by a Kashmiri journalist and education specialist Mehmood Hashmi.

Further reading 

Pakistani autobiographies